Afrowatsonius spilleri is a moth of the family Erebidae first described by George Thomas Bethune-Baker in 1908. It is found in Africa, including South Africa.

External links
 Zwier, Jaap "Sommeria spilleri Bethune-Baker 1908". Aganainae.

Endemic moths of South Africa
Spilosomina
Moths described in 1908
Moths of Africa